Charles Gibbons was a politician.

Charles Gibbons may also refer to:

Charles Gibbons (artist) (born 1957), abstract artist
Sir Charles Gibbons, 6th Baronet (1828–1909) of the Gibbons baronets

See also
Charles Gibbings
Gibbons (surname)